Sumi-e (Sumi-e, Toshiko Akiyoshi - Lew Tabackin Big Band '79) was the seventh studio recording released by the Toshiko Akiyoshi – Lew Tabackin Big Band.  Not to be confused with the 1971 Toshiko Akiyoshi Quartet release, Sumie / The Personal Aspect in Jazz.  Sumi-e refers to an East Asian style of brush painting.

Track listing
All songs composed and arranged by Toshiko Akiyoshi:
LP Side A:
 "Sumi-e"
 "Hangin' Loose"
LP Side B:
 "Quadrille, Anyone?"
 "A-10-205932"

CD re-issue
 "Sumi-e" – 7:56
 "A-10-205932" – 10:03
 "A-10-205932" – 9:52 (alternate take)
 "Hangin' Loose" – 8:46
 "Quadrille, Anyone?" – 5:50
 "Quadrille, Anyone?" – 5:55 (alternate take)

Personnel
Toshiko Akiyoshi – piano
Lew Tabackin – tenor saxophone and flute
Tom Peterson – tenor saxophone
Gary Foster – alto saxophone
Dick Spencer – alto saxophone
Bill Byrne – baritone saxophone
Steven Huffsteter – trumpet
Bobby Shew – trumpet
Mike Price – trumpet
Larry Ford – trumpet
Bill Reichenbach Jr. – trombone
Randy Aldcroft – trombone
Rick Culver – trombone
Phil Teele – bass trombone
John Heard – bass
Peter Donald – drums

Guest  artist:
Kisaku Katada – percussion

References / external links
Insights 6061 (RVC RVJ-6061)
[ Allmusic]

Toshiko Akiyoshi – Lew Tabackin Big Band albums
1979 albums